Dreams Now Reality (formerly known as Do Not Reanimate and Dreams Not Reality and officially abbreviated as DNR) is an Italian glam rock band formed in Modena, Italy. They have performed domestically, as well as internationally at venues in Russia, Japan, Ukraine, and Belarus. Their look is self-described as "Eurovisual" - taking influences from Japanese visual kei and Western glam rock. Luminor, formerly of Cinema Bizarre, has collaborated extensively with the band. The band's full name changed to Dreams Not Reality after the departure of Mantis, as the remaining members sought a more optimistic name.

They released their first single "Visual Evolution" in 2008 and first studio album, Visual Evolution Reloaded, in 2009 under the independent label Miraloop.

In January 2011, a new single "Beyond This World" was released with the first video produced by Matteo Cifelli and Toby Chapman (Spandau Ballet, Lionel Richie, Andy Taylor, Tom Jones) under Fastermaster Records.

Sebastiano Serafini joined the band in May 2011 as the fifth member "Seba", playing keyboard and performing vocals for the band. Together, they opened up for Versailles on June 4, 2011, in Salerno, and also played at the 2011 V-Rock Festival held at Saitama Super Arena. The band was also part of the lineup for V-Love Live International, which took place two days later on October 25. Their first single under Serafini's lineup, "A Taste of... Eurovisual" was released in October 2011

In September 2012 they opened up for INORAN (guitarist and co-founder of the rock band Luna Sea) for his European tour, Seven Samurais (gigs of: Vienna, Cologne)
.

In January 2013, Sieg announced that he was leaving the band. Yu Phoenix, ex-guitarist of Cinema Bizarre, eventually took his place as guitarist for the band.

In 2014 the second album DREAMFINITY was released through the crowdfunding partner PledgeMusic and KR-music.

In 2015, due a car accident of the drummer, the band have been forced to take a temporary break from the music scene, ending up canceling the Japanese performance on Visual Unite Event.

In 2017 DREAMFINITY Deluxe Edition was released through the American label Perris Records.

In 2018 a new line up has been announced, with Simo as turnist guitarist and Adam Langley on vocals. In October they opened up for Lordi, SEXORCISM European tour, (gigs of: Bologna, San Donà di Piave).

DNR was the first non-Japanese band to perform at the Stylish Wave event at Akasaka BLITZ 13 May 2012.

Band members

Current members
 Kira – bass (2008–present)
 Ash – drums (2008–present)
 Adam – vocals (2018–present)

EX members
 Mantis – vocals (2008–2009)
 Sieg – guitars (2008-2013)
 Luminor – Keyboards, vocals (2009-2011)
 Sebastiano Serafini – Keyboards, vocals (2011-2013)
 Yu Phoenix – guitar (2013–2018)
 Simo – guitar (2018–2020)
 Axia – vocals (2009–2018)

Timeline

References 

Italian rock music groups
Musical groups established in 2008